The Anthology: 1947–1972 is a double compilation album by Chicago blues singer and guitarist Muddy Waters. It contains many of his best-known songs, including his R&B single chart hits "I'm Your Hoochie Coochie Man", "Just Make Love to Me (I Just Want to Make Love to You)", and "I'm Ready". Chess and MCA Records released the set on August 28, 2001.

Reception and awards
In his review for AllMusic, Stephen Thomas Erlewine noted "if you're going to be buying two discs to get the full Muddy Waters story, you should get this instead of two separate discs, since it's simply easier.".

In 2020, the album was ranked number 483 on Rolling Stone magazine's list of the 500 greatest albums of all time: "the fifty essential cuts... run from guitar-and-standup-bass duets to full-band rompsand they still just manage to scratch the surface of Waters' legacy,"

Track listing
All songs written by McKinley Morganfield except as indicated.

Disc one
Disc one features 16 of the 20 songs previously released on His Best: 1947 to 1955.

 "Gypsy Woman" – 2:35
 "I Can't Be Satisfied" – 2:43
 "I Feel Like Going Home" – 3:12
 "Train Fare Home Blues" – 2:48
 "Mean Red Spider" – 2:19
 "Standin' Here Tremblin'" – 2:27
 "You Gonna Need My Help" – 3:03
 "Little Geneva" – 2:48
 "Rollin' and Tumblin' Part One" – 2:59
 "Rollin' Stone" – 3:08
 "Walkin' Blues" (Robert Johnson) – 2:58
 "Louisiana Blues" – 2:54
 "Long Distance Call" – 2:41
 "Honey Bee" – 3:22
 "Country Boy" – 3:13
 "She Moves Me" – 2:58
 "Still a Fool" – 3:19
 "Stuff You Gotta Watch" – 2:51
 "Who's Gonna Be Your Sweet Man When I'm Gone?" – 3:04
 "Standin' Around Cryin'" – 3:23
 "Baby Please Don't Go" – 3:18
 "Hoochie Coochie Man" (Willie Dixon) – 2:48
 "I Just Want to Make Love to You" (Dixon) – 2:52
 "I'm Ready" (Dixon) – 3:05
 "Young Fashioned Ways" (Dixon) – 3:02
 "I Want to Be Loved" (Dixon) – 2:42

Disc two
Disc two starts off with "My Eyes (Keep Me in Trouble)" plus three further tracks from His Best:1947 to 1955. Sixteen more tracks on the disc were on His Best:1956 to 1964 - the four tracks excluded are "All Aboard" (though the remake from the 1969 album Fathers and Sons is present), "She's Into Something", "You Need Love" (later made into "You Need Loving" and "Whole Lotta Love"), and "My Love Strikes Like Lightning". The other tracks on disc two were featured on The Chess Box.

 "My Eyes (Keep Me in Trouble)" (T-Bone Walker) – 3:12
 "Mannish Boy" (Morganfield, Mel London, Ellas McDaniel) – 2:58
 "Sugar Sweet" (London) – 2:31
 "Trouble No More" – 2:42
 "Forty Days and Forty Nights" (Bernard Roth) – 2:53
 "Just to Be with You" (M. Kalfin, Roth) – 3:15
 "Don't Go No Farther" (Dixon) – 2:56
 "Diamonds at Your Feet" – 2:26
 "I Love the Life I Live, I Live the Life I Love" (Dixon) – 2:52
 "Got My Mojo Working" (Preston Foster, Morganfield) – 2:53
 "Rock Me" – 3:13
 "Look What You've Done" – 2:24
 "She's Nineteen Years Old" – 3:19
 "Close to You" (Dixon) – 3:07
 "Walking Thru the Park" – 2:47
 "Take the Bitter with the Sweet" (James Burke Oden) – 3:08
 "I Feel So Good [Live]" (Big Bill Broonzy, Richard Thompson) – 2:58
 "You Shook Me" (Dixon) – 2:44
 "My Home Is in the Delta" – 4:00
 "Good Morning Little School Girl" (Sonny Boy Williamson) – 3:15
 "The Same Thing" (Dixon) – 2:44
 "You Can't Lose What You Ain't Never Had" – 2:57
 "All Aboard (Fathers & Sons)" – 2:53
 "Can't Get No Grindin'" – 2:45

Personnel
Per Allmusic.

Performers

Muddy Waterslead vocals, guitar
Jimmy Rogers – guitar
Fred Robinson –  guitar
Earl Hooker – guitar
Pat Hare – guitar
Buddy Guy – guitar
Leroy Foster – guitar
Luther Tucker – guitar
Jeffrey M. Carpharmonica
James Cotton – harmonica
Little Walter – harmonica
Junior Wells – harmonica
Fred Belowdrums
Leonard Chessbass drum
Francis Clay – drums
Elgin Evans – drums
Sam Lay – drums
Clifton James – drums
Willie Dixondouble bass
Andrew Stephenson – bass
Phil Upchurch – bass
Lafayette Leakepiano
Otis Spann – piano
Sunnyland Slim – piano
A.C. Reed – tenor saxophone

Production

Leonard Chess – producer
Willie Dixon – producer
Norman Dayron – producer
Andy McKaie – producer
Beth Stempel – production coordination
Mary Katherine Aldin – liner notes
Andy McKaie – reissue compilation
Mike Fink – design
Vartan – art direction

References

Muddy Waters albums
2001 greatest hits albums
Albums produced by Leonard Chess
Albums produced by Willie Dixon
Chess Records compilation albums